Carlos Manuel Calvo Muñoz (born 7 March 1946) is a Chilean philosopher and scholar who is member of the Chilean Constitutional Convention.

Calvo Muñoz has been philosophy teacher at his alma mater Pontifical Catholic University of Valparaíso (PUCV) and the University of La Serena. Similarly, the Universidad Euro Hispanoamericana of Mexico gave him an honorary degree.

References

External links
 BCN Profile

Living people
1947 births
Pontifical Catholic University of Valparaíso alumni
Stanford University alumni
Academic staff of the Pontifical Catholic University of Valparaíso
Academic staff of the University of La Serena
21st-century Chilean politicians
Members of the Chilean Constitutional Convention